This article lists the results and fixtures for the Qatar women's national football team.
The national team's first activity was in 2010, when they debuted by participating in Arabia Women's Cup in Bahrain, in which they faced Bahrain, Syria and Palestine. the team was quite unsuccessful as they finished bottom of the group losing all matches, Qatar is unranked in the FIFA Women's World Rankings. their latest FIFA ranking was in September 2015 when they ranked 139 out of 147. since 2014 the team got inactive. but appeared on some special events

Record per opponent
Key

The following table shows Qatar' all-time official international record per opponent:

Last updated: Qatar vs Afghanistan, 10 November 2021.

Results

2010

2012

2013

2014

2021

See also
 Qatar national football team results

References

External links
 Qatar results on The Roon Ba
 Qatar results on Soccerway
 Qatar results on worldfootball.net

2010s in Qatar
Qatar